Asber Nasution (born 15 December 1939) is an Indonesian weightlifter. He competed in the men's featherweight event at the 1960 Summer Olympics.

References

1939 births
Living people
Indonesian male weightlifters
Olympic weightlifters of Indonesia
Weightlifters at the 1960 Summer Olympics
People from Tebing Tinggi
Weightlifters at the 1958 Asian Games
Weightlifters at the 1966 Asian Games
Asian Games competitors for Indonesia
20th-century Indonesian people